HMS Coromandel was a wooden paddle dispatch vessel of the Royal Navy. She was built for the P&O company as the passenger and cargo steamer Tartar. The Navy purchased her in 1855 and she participated in several battles in Chinese waters, including having been sunk and recovered. The Navy sold her in 1866 and she went through several changes in ownership before she was broken up in 1876.

P&O company
Tartar had a shallow-draught wooden hull, strengthened by diagonal planking and reinforced with iron scantlings.

On 8 September 1853 she sailed from Southampton for the Far East where she was to provide a feeder service for the P&O Line on the China coast. Cadiz towed Tartar for the first four days, but then Tartar completed the rest of voyage to Singapore mostly under sail.

On 4 June 1854 Tartar sailed to the Paracel Islands to assist , which had run aground there on 26 May. Salvage efforts were abandoned on 10 June.

Royal Navy
Lieutenant Sholto Douglas commissioned Coromandel in October 1856 for operations on the Canton river. She served in the Arrow War (1856–1860) in China, firing the first shot of the war on 23 October 1856 during the capture of Canton.

On 1 June 1857 she was at the Battle of Fatshan Creek, during which she ran aground. There she served as the flagship for Rear-Admiral Michael Seymour. On 22 September she was under the command of Master William H. Vine.

Coromandel was at all three of the battles of the Pei-ho or Taku Forts: First (1858), Second (1859), and Third Battle of the Taku Forts (1860). In the second, in 1859, she was sunk but was later raised, repaired, and returned to service. On 23 August 1859 she was the flagship of Vice-Admiral James Hope.

From 17 August 1863 she was under the command of Lieutenant George Poole. Euryalus participated in both the bombardment of Kagoshima on 16 August 1863 and the bombardment of Shimonoseki in September 1864; it is not clear whether Coromandel was in company.

Later career
The Navy sold Coromandel in 1866 to R. Byrne & Company, Hong Kong. In 1867 she was sold to Kishu, Japan, where her new owners renamed her Naruto.

Glover & Co., of Hong Kong, purchased her in 1868, and converted her to screw propulsion. The company went bankrupt and she was sold to Wright & Co., of Nagasaki, who sold her to Iwatani Shozo, who sold her to Hunt & Co., managers in Japan for the Netherlands Trading Society. She then underwent extensive repairs.

Fate
In 1876 Hunt & Co. sold the vessel to shipbreakers. She had been laid up at Yokohama for some time during which her hull had suffered from white ants.

Citations

References

External links
 

1853 ships
Ships built on the Isle of Wight
Steamships of the United Kingdom
Merchant ships of the United Kingdom
Sloops of the Royal Navy
Sloops of the United Kingdom
Maritime incidents in June 1857